The End of the Beginning may refer to:

 A quotation from a 1942 speech by Winston Churchill concerning the Second Battle of El Alamein

Literature 
 End of the Beginning (novel), a 2005 Days of Infamy novel by Harry Turtledove
 The End of the Beginning (play), a 1937 play by Sean O'Casey
 "The End of the Beginning", a short story by Ray Bradbury, included in his 1959 collection A Medicine for Melancholy

Music

Albums 
 The End of the Beginning (God Is an Astronaut album) or the title song, 2002
 The End of the Beginning (Judie Tzuke album), 2004
 The End of the Beginning (Like a Storm album) or the title song, 2009
 The End of the Beginning (Murs album), 2003
 The End of the Beginning (EP) or the title song, by Jonathan Seet, 2009
 The End of the Beginning, by Richie Havens, 1976
 The End of the Beginning, a video by Sabbat, 1990

Songs 
 "End of the Beginning" (song), by Black Sabbath, 2013
 "End of the Beginning", by Jason Becker from Perspective, 1996
 "End of the Beginning", by 30 Seconds to Mars from 30 Seconds to Mars, 2002
 "End of the Beginning", by David Phelps
 "The End of the Beginning", the alternative title to Pink Floyd's "A Saucerful of Secrets" segment in their 1969 concept tour The Man and The Journey

Television episodes  
 "End of the Beginning" (Agents of S.H.I.E.L.D.)
 "The End of the Beginning" (Hercules: The Legendary Journeys)
 "The End of the Beginning", an episode of The Bold Type
 "End of the Beginning", an episode of The Brothers
 "The End of the Beginning", an episode of The Fosters

See also
 The Beginning of the End (disambiguation)
 The End Is the Beginning (disambiguation)